Serrion Teichos or Serreion Teichos (Σέρρειον τεῖχος) was a Greek city in ancient Thrace, located in the region of the Propontis. It was a member of the Delian League and appears in tribute lists of Athens between 428/7 and 418/7 BCE. It later bore the name of Ganus or Ganos (Γάνος or Γᾶνος). It is under this name that the town is mentioned by geographers and historians, as a noted mountain fortress of Thrace.

Its site is near the modern Ganos, Turkey.

See also
Greek colonies in Thrace

References

Greek colonies in Thrace
Ancient Greek archaeological sites in Turkey
Archaeological sites in the Aegean Region
Populated places in ancient Thrace
Former populated places in Turkey
Members of the Delian League